Sir Henry Dalrymple Des Voeux, 5th Baronet (7 September 1822 – 20 January 1894) was an English cricketer. Des Voeux's batting style is unknown.

The son of the Reverend Henry Des Voeux and Frances Dalrymple, Des Voeux was born at Carlton, Nottinghamshire. He studied at Balliol College, Oxford, matriculating in 1841 and graduating B.A. in 1845. He made two first-class appearances for Oxford University Cricket Club, playing against the Marylebone Cricket Club and Cambridge University in 1844. In his two matches, he scored a total of 34 runs at an average of 17.00, with a high score of 25 not out.

Des Voeux married Lady Alice Magdalene Grey Egerton, daughter of Thomas Egerton, 2nd Earl of Wilton, on 13 August 1863. He succeeded Frederick Asheton Des Voeux, 4th Baronet as the 5th Baronet of the Des Voeux Baronetcy following his death in March 1872. Des Voeux died at Westminster, London on 20 January 1894 and was succeeded by Charles Champagne Des Voeux, 6th Baronet. Charles Frederick Des Voeux, a Royal Navy officer lost in the 1845 Franklin Expedition, was his brother and William Des Vœux, a colonial administrator, was his half-brother.

References

External links
Henry Des Voeux at ESPNcricinfo
Henry Des Voeux at CricketArchive

1822 births
1894 deaths
People from Carlton, Nottinghamshire
Cricketers from Nottinghamshire
Alumni of Balliol College, Oxford
English cricketers
Oxford University cricketers
Baronets in the Baronetage of Ireland
des Voeux family
English people of French descent
English people of Irish descent